O`Mega is a luxury charter yacht.  She was built in 1985 as a small passenger vessel from the shipyard of Mitsubishi Heavy Industries. In 2002 she was sold and converted into a superyacht. One year later the steel motor yacht was completed and handed over to the owner. She was number 29 in the Power & Motor Yacht magazine's list of the World's 100 Largest Yachts 2008. In 2011 she underwent a refit and her hull colour was changed from black to white.

Crew 
O'Mega's permanent crew consists of the captain and 29 crew members.

Design 
She can accommodate 32 passengers and 26 crew members.

See also 
 List of motor yachts by length

References

External links
O`Mega charter site

Motor yachts
1985 ships
Ships built by Mitsubishi Heavy Industries